Rebecca Kershaw (born 11 August 1990, Lancaster) is a British water polo player. She competed for Great Britain in the women's tournament at the 2012 Summer Olympics. This was the first ever Olympic GB women's water polo team.

References

British female water polo players
Olympic water polo players of Great Britain
Water polo players at the 2012 Summer Olympics
1990 births
Living people
People from Lancaster, Lancashire